Delayed milestone, also called developmental delays, is used to describe the condition where a child does not reach one of these stages at the expected age. However, in most cases, a wide variety of ages can be considered normal, and not a cause for medical concern. Milestones are often measured using percentiles, and for many milestones a value between the 5th and 95th percentile does not require intervention, though values towards the edges of that range can be associated with other medical conditions.
It is not possible to treat.
It has been suggested that measurement of posture sway may be an early indicator.

References

External links 

 CDC's "Learn the Signs. Act Early.” campaign - Information for parents on early childhood development and developmental disabilities
 "Recognizing Developmental Delays in Children", WebMD, retrieved 31 May 2019

Symptoms and signs